The 1932 United States presidential election in West Virginia took place on November 8, 1932, as part of the 1932 United States presidential election. West Virginia voters chose eight representatives, or electors, to the Electoral College, who voted for president and vice president.

West Virginia was won by Governor Franklin D. Roosevelt (D–New York), running with Speaker John Nance Garner, with 54.47 percent of the popular vote, against incumbent President Herbert Hoover (R–California), running with Vice President Charles Curtis, with 44.47 percent of the popular vote.

Despite Roosevelt being the first Democrat to win a majority of West Virginia’s vote since Grover Cleveland as far back as 1884, West Virginia was Hoover’s tenth-best state by popular vote share and twelfth-best by percentage margin, voting overall 7.76 points more Republican than the nation at-large. The election nonetheless marked the beginning of West Virginia's transition to a strongly Democratic-leaning state during the 20th century. It voted Democratic in every election from 1932 through 1996 save the national Republican landslides of 1956, 1972, and 1984; it did not vote for a Republican in a close election until 2000 or for a losing Republican until 2008. Roosevelt was the first Democratic victor in Hancock County since James Buchanan in 1856, the first Democrat to win Monongalia County since Stephen A. Douglas in 1860, and the first Democratic victor in Brooke County since Horatio Seymour in 1868.

Results

Results by county

References

West Virginia
1932
1932 West Virginia elections